Mesolia pelopa is a moth in the family Crambidae. It was described by Turner in 1947. It is found in Australia, where it has been recorded from the Northern Territory.

The wingspan is about 18 mm. The forewings are brown, but fuscous at the dorsum. The costal edge is white and there are two slender white lines from the costa before the apex, as well as a blackish terminal line. The hindwings are pale grey.

References

Ancylolomiini
Moths described in 1947